Hugo Ruf (born 9 April 1925 in Schramberg/Württemberg, died 1 November1999 in Brauweiler near Cologne) was an influential German harpsichordist, music pedagogue and a pioneer of early music revival in Germany. He is noted in particular for his recordings of music by Carl Philipp Emmanuel Bach. He was instrumental (along with the conductor Helmuth Koch) in the 20th century revival of C.P.E.Bach's music.

Biography
Ruf studied harpsichord at the Hochschule für Musik Freiburg since 1946. From 1967 until 1990, he taught at the Cologne School of Music, since 1971 as an lifetime professor. He was director of the Seminary for old Music.

Recordings

References

Web
 Website Schott music

1925 births
1999 deaths
Early music
Musicians from Cologne
German harpsichordists
Academic staff of the Hochschule für Musik und Tanz Köln
Place of birth missing
Hochschule für Musik Freiburg alumni
20th-century classical musicians
20th-century German musicians